Christopher Cannon is a medievalist at Johns Hopkins University. He is currently Bloomberg Distinguished Professor of English and  Classics, previously Chair of Classics, and from 2020, Vice Dean for the Humanities and Social Sciences in the Krieger School of Arts and Sciences. His research and writings have focused on the works of Geoffrey Chaucer, early Middle English, and elementary learning in the Middle Ages.

Education 
He was educated at Harvard University (AB, AM, PhD).  He received his doctorate in 1993 for a thesis "The making of Chaucer's English: a study in the formation of a literary language".

Career

Prior to moving to Hopkins in 2017, Cannon was chair of the Department of English at New York University for 5 years. He held the Katharine Jex Blake Research Fellowship at Girton College, Cambridge (1993-6) and taught (for a time concurrently with his research fellowship) at UCLA (1995-6). He then taught at the University of Oxford in the Faculty of English and as Tutorial Fellow of St Edmund Hall (1997-2000) and, then, in the Faculty of English at the University of Cambridge, first as a Fellow of Pembroke College and then, again, as a Fellow of Girton College. He is general co-editor of Oxford Studies in Medieval Literature and Culture.

Works

Monographs 
 From Literacy to Literature: England, 1300-1400 Oxford University Press, 2016  Review:
 Middle English Literature: a cultural history  Polity, 2008 .
 The Grounds of English Literature Oxford ; New York : Oxford University Press, 2004  Review:<ref>{{cite journal|last=Gillespie|first=Vincent|year=2007|title=Review of The Grounds of English Literature by Christopher Cannon|journal=The Modern Language Review|volume=102|issue=1|pages=197–198|doi=10.1353/mlr.2007.0310 |s2cid=246648134 }}</ref>
 The Making of Chaucer's English: A Study of Words. Cambridge: Cambridge University Press, 1998.

Edited works
Mann, Jill, Christopher Cannon, and Maura Nolan. Medieval Latin and Middle English Literature: Essays in Honour of Jill Mann''. Cambridge: Cambridge University Press, 2013.

Editions 
Cannon is currently co-editing with Harvard's James Simpson on a new edition of all of Chaucer's  whose goal is to produce an edition of Chaucer's work that sounds "authentically Chaucerian".

Prizes 
William Riley Parker Prize at MLA (2014)
John Simon Guggenheim Foundation Fellowship (2002-3)
The Van Courtlandt Elliott Prize, Medieval Academy of America (1995)

References

External links 
 Cannon's profile at Johns Hopkins University
 Christopher Cannon reads ‘Truth’ by Geoffrey Chaucer

Living people
Classical scholars of Johns Hopkins University
Harvard University alumni
Chaucer scholars
Classical scholars of New York University
Classical scholars of the University of Oxford
Fellows of Girton College, Cambridge
University of California, Los Angeles faculty
1965 births